David Patrick Saunders (born October 19, 1960, in Seattle, Washington) is a former volleyball player from the United States. He was a member of the American Men's National Team that won the gold medal at the 1984 Summer Olympics. Four years later, when Seoul hosted the 1988 Summer Olympics, he once again won a gold medal.

He played for the UCLA Bruins and won three NCAA national championships. Saunders is a member of the 2022 class of the UCLA Athletic Hall of Fame.

See also
 USA Volleyball

References
 

1960 births
Living people
Olympic gold medalists for the United States in volleyball
Sportspeople from Seattle
Place of birth missing (living people)
Volleyball players at the 1984 Summer Olympics
Volleyball players at the 1988 Summer Olympics
American men's volleyball players
Medalists at the 1988 Summer Olympics
Medalists at the 1984 Summer Olympics
Goodwill Games medalists in volleyball
Competitors at the 1986 Goodwill Games
UCLA Bruins men's volleyball players
Outside hitters